John Koenig may refer to:

 John Koenig (diplomat), American diplomat
 John Franklin Koenig (1924–2008), American artist
 John Koenig, creator of The Dictionary of Obscure Sorrows
 John Koenig (Space: 1999), a fictional character in the TV series Space: 1999

See also 
 Johann König (disambiguation)